Hyeonpung Gwak clan is one of the Korean clans. Their Bon-gwan is in Dalseong County, Daegu. According to the research held in 2015, the number of Hyeonpung Gwak clan’s member was 166608. Their founder was  who was naturalized in Goryeo from Song dynasty. According to the epitaph coming out from ’s grave in 1930,  passed imperial examination in 1138, worked as munha sirang pyeongjangsa (문하시랑평장사; 門下侍郞平章事) and Jinzi Guanglu Daifu, and became Prince of Posan. After that, ’s descendant founded Hyeonpung Gwak clan and made Posan, Hyeonpung Gwak clan’s Bon-gwan. clan’s Bon-gwan.

See also 
 Korean clan names of foreign origin

References

External links 
 

 
Gwak clans
Korean clan names of Chinese origin